Stonewall is a town in Clarke County, Mississippi, United States. The population was 1,088 at the 2010 census.

History
A cotton mill was established here in 1868. The town was named after Confederate Army General Stonewall Jackson.

Stonewall's major industry from 1868 until 2002 was the cotton mill which operated as Burlington Industries from 1962 onward. In 2002, Burlington announced that it would be closing the Stonewall plant and put 850 people out of work.

Geography
The Chickasawhay River forms the western boundary of the town.

Demographics

2020 census

As of the 2020 United States census, there were 879 people, 405 households, and 210 families residing in the town.

2000 census
As of the census of 2000, there were 1,149 people, 461 households, and 319 families residing in the town. The population density was 435.4 people per square mile (168.0/km). There were 542 housing units at an average density of 205.4 per square mile (79.3/km). The racial makeup of the town was 75.37% White, 23.67% African American, 0.52% Native American, 0.09% from other races, and 0.35% from two or more races. Hispanic or Latino of any race were 0.44% of the population.

There were 461 households, out of which 30.8% had children under the age of 18 living with them, 48.6% were married couples living together, 16.7% had a female householder with no husband present, and 30.6% were non-families. 27.8% of all households were made up of individuals, and 11.5% had someone living alone who was 65 years of age or older. The average household size was 2.49 and the average family size was 3.05.

In the town, the population was spread out, with 27.2% under the age of 18, 9.0% from 18 to 24, 26.5% from 25 to 44, 22.9% from 45 to 64, and 14.4% who were 65 years of age or older. The median age was 35 years. For every 100 females, there were 93.8 males. For every 100 females age 18 and over, there were 87.0 males.

The median income for a household in the town was $23,125, and the median income for a family was $31,172. Males had a median income of $26,477 versus $22,404 for females. The per capita income for the town was $12,930. About 18.3% of families and 23.8% of the population were below the poverty line, including 34.6% of those under age 18 and 16.0% of those age 65 or over.

Education
Stonewall is served by the Quitman School District.

Notable person
 Herman Dunlap, Negro league outfielder
 Danny Pearson, composer and singer-songwriter

See also
Death of Jonathan Sanders - Sanders choked on a bag of cocaine while restrained by police in Stonewall

References

Towns in Clarke County, Mississippi
Towns in Mississippi
Meridian micropolitan area